Simon Wallfisch (born 22 May 1982) is a British-German classical singer and cellist.

Life and Career 
Simon Joseph Lasker Wallfisch was born in London in 1982 to a family of professional musicians: his father is British cellist Raphael Wallfisch, his mother the Australian born baroque violinist Elizabeth Wallfisch. His grandparents are cellist Anita Lasker-Wallfisch and pianist Peter Wallfisch. His older brother is composer Benjamin Wallfisch, his younger sister is singer-songwriter Joanna Wallfisch.

Education 
Between 2000 and 2006, Simon Wallfisch studied at the London Royal College of Music singing, violoncello and conducting. He continued his studies at Berlin's Hochschule für Musik Hanns Eisler Berlin 2006/07 and until 2009 at University of Music and Theatre Leipzig. During that period he sang as guest soloist at the Leipzig opera house, Theater Magdeburg, Anhaltisches Theater Dessau, Stadttheater Fürth and at the

Career 
In concerts he sang Johann Sebastian Bach's Weihnachtsoratorium at the Brighton Early Music Festival in 2017 and Alexander Goehr's "after 'The Waking'" with the Nash Ensemble at London's Wigmore Hall

Wallfisch performed as cellist in the Holocaust Memorial Day programme on BBC Two in 2015.

Discography 
 2014 – Geoffrey Bush Songs, with pianist Edward Rushton. Lyrita (SRCD343)
 2015 – French Songs: from la belle époque to les années folles, with works by Caplet, Honegger, Milhaud and Ravel), with pianist Edward Rushton. Nimbus Records (NI5938)
 2018 – Gesänge des Orients, with pianist Edward Rushton. Nimbus Records (NI5971)
 2019 – Robert Schumann: Songs of Love and Death, with pianist Edward Rushton. Resonus Classics (RES10247)
 2020 – Johannes Brahms: Songs of Loss and Betrayal, with pianist Edward Rushton. Resonus Classics (RES10258)

Activism 
Wallfisch is an activist against antisemitism. He gives talks and tells his family's history in schools, and accompanies his grandmother Anita Lasker-Wallfisch, who is a frequent guest in talkshows and interviews. He is a trustee of the International Centre for Suppressed Music (ICSM), and performed works by "classical composers who were stopped from working, forced into exile or killed by the Nazis."

References

External links 
 
 Simon Wallfisch on Operabase

1982 births
Living people
Musicians from London
Alumni of the Royal College of Music
English people of Australian descent
Hochschule für Musik Hanns Eisler Berlin alumni
University of Music and Theatre Leipzig alumni
English baritones
English people of German-Jewish descent
Jewish opera singers
English cellists
Jewish classical musicians
21st-century English male singers
21st-century cellists